This is a comparison of streaming media systems. A more complete list of streaming media systems is also available.

General
The following tables compare general and technical information for a number of streaming media systems both audio and video. Please see the individual systems' linked articles for further information.

Operating system support

Container format support

Information about what digital container formats are supported.

Protocol support

Information about which internet protocols are supported for broadcasting streaming media content.

Features

See also

 Community radio
 Comparison of video services
 Content delivery network
 Digital television
 Electronic commerce
 Internet radio
 Internet radio device
 Internet television
 IPTV
 List of Internet radio stations
 List of music streaming services
 Multicast
 P2PTV
 Protection of Broadcasts and Broadcasting Organizations Treaty
 Push technology
 Streaming media
 Ustream
 Webcast
 Web television

References

External links
 See the container and protocol of VLC Media Player from here: 

Computer networking
Applications of distributed computing
Cloud storage
Digital television
Distributed algorithms
Distributed data storage
Distributed data storage systems
File sharing
File sharing networks
Film and video technology
Internet broadcasting
Internet radio
Streaming television
Multimedia
Peer-to-peer computing
Peercasting
 
Streaming media systems
Video hosting
Video on demand
streaming media systems